Irina Volkert née Kuhnt (born 18 January 1968 in Bad Harzburg, Lower Saxony) is a former field hockey player from Germany.

She was a member of the Women's National Team that won the silver medal at the 1992 Summer Olympics in Barcelona, Spain. She also competed in the 1996 Summer Olympics. In total, she has represented Germany in 147 matches.

During her club career she played for the hockey clubs Eintracht Braunschweig and Berliner HC.

References

 databaseOlympics

External links
 

1968 births
Living people
People from Goslar (district)
Sportspeople from Lower Saxony
German female field hockey players
Field hockey players at the 1992 Summer Olympics
Field hockey players at the 1996 Summer Olympics
Olympic field hockey players of Germany
Olympic silver medalists for Germany
Place of birth missing (living people)
Olympic medalists in field hockey
Medalists at the 1992 Summer Olympics